The 1996–97 OHL season was the 17th season of the Ontario Hockey League. The Niagara Falls Thunder move to Erie becoming the Erie Otters. Seventeen teams each played 66 games. The Oshawa Generals won the J. Ross Robertson Cup, defeating the Ottawa 67's.

Relocation

Niagara Falls Thunder to Erie Otters
The Niagara Falls Thunder relocated to Erie, and renamed their club to the Erie Otters, becoming the second team in the Ontario Hockey League to be based in the United States and the first OHL team in the state of Pennsylvania. The Thunder played in Niagara Falls from 1988-96, reaching the post-season in six of their eight seasons. Niagara Falls went to the J. Ross Robertson Cup one time in their eight seasons, in their first season in 1988-89, where they lost to the Peterborough Petes in the final round.

The Otters new home arena was the Erie Civic Center. The club would remain in the Central Division.

New Arena

Detroit Whalers
After splitting the 1995-96 season between the Palace of Auburn Hills and Oak Park Ice Arena, the Detroit Whalers moved into their new home, the Compuware Sports Arena, based in Plymouth, Michigan.

Regular season

Final standings
Note: DIV = Division; GP = Games played; W = Wins; L = Losses; T = Ties; OTL = Overtime losses; GF = Goals for; GA = Goals against; PTS = Points; x = clinched playoff berth; y = clinched division title; z = earned first round bye

East Division

Central Division

West Division

Scoring leaders

Playoffs
The 67's waived their right to a first-round bye, having lost in the second round the previous season after accepting a first-round bye.

Division quarter-finals

East Division

(1) Ottawa 67's vs. (5) Belleville Bulls

(3) Peterborough Petes vs. (4) Kingston Frontenacs

Central Division

(2) Guelph Storm vs. (5) Erie Otters

(3) Barrie Colts vs. (4) Owen Sound Platers

West Division

(1) Sault Ste. Marie Greyhounds vs. (4) Detroit Whalers

(2) Sarnia Sting vs. (3) Windsor Spitfires

OHL quarter-finals

(E1) Ottawa 67's vs. (C3) Barrie Colts

(W1) Sault Ste. Marie Greyhounds vs. (C2) Guelph Storm

(C1) Kitchener Rangers vs. (W2) Sarnia Sting

(E2) Oshawa Generals vs. (E3) Peterborough Petes

OHL semi-finals

(E1) Ottawa 67's vs. (C2) Guelph Storm

(C1) Kitchener Rangers vs. (E2) Oshawa Generals

J. Ross Robertson Cup

(E1) Ottawa 67's vs. (E2) Oshawa Generals

All-Star teams

First team
Alyn McCauley, Centre, Ottawa 67's
Daniel Cleary, Left Wing, Belleville Bulls
Cameron Mann, Right Wing, Peterborough Petes
Sean Blanchard, Defence, Ottawa 67's
Andy Delmore, Defence, Sarnia Sting
Zac Bierk, Goaltender, Peterborough Petes
Brian Kilrea, Coach, Ottawa 67's

Second team
Joe Thornton, Centre, Sault Ste. Marie Greyhounds
Dave Duerden, Left Wing, Peterborough Petes
Alexandre Volchkov, Right Wing, Barrie Colts
D.J. Smith, Defence, Windsor Spitfires
Marty Wilford, Defence, Oshawa Generals
Kory Cooper, Goaltender, Belleville Bulls
Bill Stewart, Coach, Oshawa Generals

Third team
Jan Bulis, Centre, Barrie Colts
Dwayne Hay, Left Wing, Guelph Storm
Joel Trottier, Right Wing, Ottawa 67's
Nick Boynton, Defence, Ottawa 67's
Chris Hajt, Defence, Guelph Storm
Robert Esche, Goaltender, Detroit Whalers
Peter DeBoer, Coach, Detroit Whalers

Awards

1997 OHL Priority Selection
On June 7, 1997, the OHL conducted the 1997 Ontario Hockey League Priority Selection at Maple Leaf Gardens in Toronto, Ontario. The expansion team Toronto St. Michael's Majors, who were set to begin play during the 1997-98 season, held the first overall pick in the draft, and selected Charlie Stephens from the Leamington Flyers. Stephens was awarded the Jack Ferguson Award, awarded to the top pick in the draft.

Below are the players who were selected in the first round of the 1997 Ontario Hockey League Priority Selection.

See also
List of OHA Junior A standings
List of OHL seasons
1997 Memorial Cup
1997 NHL Entry Draft
1996 in sports
1997 in sports

References

HockeyDB

Ontario Hockey League seasons
OHL